This is a list of the members of the Australian House of Representatives in the 16th Australian Parliament, which was elected at the 1940 election on 21 September 1940. The incumbent United Australia Party led by Prime Minister of Australia Robert Menzies with coalition partner the Country Party led by Archie Cameron narrowly defeated the opposition Australian Labor Party led by John Curtin and continued to hold power with the support of two independents. In October 1941 the two independents switched their support to Curtin, bringing him to power.

Notes

References

Members of Australian parliaments by term
20th-century Australian politicians